Sheikhupura Fort (Punjabi) is a Mughal-era fort built in 1607 near the city of Sheikhupura in Punjab, Although, there is no conclusive evidence supporting this, the Tuzk-e-Jahangiri mentions that the Emperor assigned the job of constructing the Fort to Sikandar Moeen on his hunting trip to Hiran Minar in 1607AD. It was built during the reign of Emperor Jahangir. The fort was drastically altered during the Sikh-era, with numerous buildings constructed - some with exquisite Sikh-era frescoes. In 1808, the fort was conquered by the six-year-old of Maharaja Ranjit Singh, Prince Kharak Singh. Ranjit Singh granted this fort as “Jagir”, in 1811 to his wife and the prince's mother, Maharani Datar Kaur who had a considerable role in its rehabilitation and lived in it to her last day. 

In mid 19th century when power turned to the British, the fort of Sheikhupura was used for the 'house arrest' of Maharaja’s last queen, Maharani Jind Kaur the mother of Maharaja Duleep Singh.

The fort is located near the Hiran Minar, built as a memorial for the pet antelope of Emperor Jahangir. The fort was heavily damaged but it is repaired and now open for tourists.

Gallery

See also

List of forts in Pakistan
List of museums in Pakistan

References

Forts in Punjab, Pakistan
Sheikhupura District
1607 establishments in Asia